Mary Louise Cleave (born February 5, 1947) is an American engineer and a  former NASA astronaut. She also served from 2005 to 2007 as NASA Associate Administrator for the Science Mission Directorate.

Early life
Cleave was born in Southampton, New York as the daughter of Howard Cleave and Barbara Cleave, both teachers. She grew up in Great Neck, New York, and has an older (Trudy Carter) and a younger sister (Barbara "Bobbie" Cleave Bosworth).

Education
In 1965 Cleave graduated from Great Neck North High School, Great Neck, New York. In 1969 she received a bachelor of science degree in Biological Sciences from Colorado State University, and in 1975 a master of science in Microbial Ecology from Utah State University. In 1979 she received a doctorate in Civil and Environmental Engineering from Utah State University.

Academic career
Cleave held graduate research, research phycologist, and research engineer assignments in the Ecology Center and the Utah Water Research Laboratory at Utah State University from September 1971 to June 1980. Her work included research on the productivity of the algal component of cold desert soil crusts in the Great Basin Desert south of Snowville, Utah; algal removal with intermittent sand filtration and prediction of minimum river flow necessary to maintain certain game fish; the effects of increased salinity and oil shale leachates on freshwater phytoplankton productivity; development of the Surface Impoundment Assessment document and computer program (FORTRAN) for current and future processing of data from surface impoundments in Utah; and design and implementation of an algal bioassay center and a workshop for bioassay techniques for the Intermountain West.

NASA career
Cleave was selected as an astronaut in May 1980. Her technical assignments have included: flight software verification in the Shuttle Avionics Integration Laboratory (SAIL); CAPCOM on five Space Shuttle flights; Malfunctions Procedures Book; Crew Equipment Design. A veteran of two space flights, Cleave logged a total of 10 days, 22 hours, 02 minutes, 24 seconds in space, orbited the Earth 172 times and traveled 3.94 million miles. She was a mission specialist on STS-61-B (November 26 to December 3, 1985) and STS-30 (May 4–8, 1989).

Cleave left JSC in May 1991 to join NASA's Goddard Space Flight Center in Greenbelt, Maryland. She worked in the Laboratory for Hydrospheric Processes as the Project Manager for SeaWiFS (Sea-viewing, Wide-Field-of-view-Sensor), an ocean color sensor which is monitoring vegetation globally. Cleave served as Associate Administrator, Science Mission Directorate, NASA Headquarters, Washington, D.C.  She stepped down from that position in April 2007 and was succeeded by Dr. Alan Stern.

Spaceflight experience
STS-61-B Atlantis (Nov 26 to December 3, 1985) launched at night from the Kennedy Space Center, Florida, and returned to land on Runway 22 at Edwards Air Force Base, California. During the mission, the crew deployed the MORELOS-B, AUSSAT II, and SATCOM K-2 communications satellites, conducted 2 six-hour spacewalks to demonstrate space station construction techniques with the EASE/ACCESS experiments, operated the Continuous Flow Electrophoresis (CFES) experiment for McDonnell Douglas and a Getaway Special (GAS) container for Telesat, Canada, conducted several Mexican Payload Specialist Experiments for the Mexican Government, and tested the Orbiter Experiments Digital Autopilot (OEX DAP). This was the heaviest payload weight carried to orbit by the Space Shuttle to date. Mission duration was 165 hours, 4 minutes, 49 seconds.

STS-30 on Space Shuttle Atlantis (May 4–8, 1989) was a four-day mission during which the crew successfully deployed the Magellan Venus-exploration spacecraft, the first U.S. planetary science mission launched since 1978, and the first planetary probe to be deployed from the Shuttle. Magellan arrived at Venus in August 1990 and radar-mapped over 95% of the surface of Venus. Magellan has been one of NASA's most successful scientific missions providing valuable information about the Venusian atmosphere and magnetic field. In addition, the crew also worked on secondary payloads involving Indium crystal growth, electrical storm, and Earth observation studies. Mission duration was 96 hours, 57 minutes, 35 seconds. On January 18, 2009, as the inaugural speaker in the Heyden Distinguished Lecture Series, Cleave told students and others at Georgetown University about her education and career and showed an original film of her shuttle mission in 1985.

Organizations
 Society for Professional Engineers
 Association of Space Explorers
 Women in Aerospace
 Tri Beta, Beta Beta Beta
 Sigma Xi
 Tau Beta Pi

References

External links
 
 Spacefacts biography of Mary L. Cleave

1947 births
Living people
Women astronauts
American women engineers
Utah State University alumni
People from Southampton (town), New York
NASA civilian astronauts
People from Great Neck, New York
Beta Beta Beta
Great Neck North High School alumni
Space Shuttle program astronauts